Ernst Höpfner (3 June 1836, Rawitsch – 28 February 1915, Göttingen) was a German educator and philologist.

Biography 
He studied philology at the Universities of Halle and Bonn, then engaged in study trips through France and England. In 1859 he became an Oberlehrer in Neuruppin, later serving as a director at the Realschule zum Heiligen Geist in Breslau (from 1868). In 1873 he was appointed Provinzialschulrat in Koblenz, and from 1888 onward, was associated with the Ministry of Culture in Berlin. Beginning in 1894, he served as a curator at the University of Göttingen.

In 1868, with philologist Julius Zacher, he founded the journal, Zeitschrift für deutsche Philologie. In 1890 he founded the Gesellschaft für deutsche Erziehungs- und Schulgeschichte ("Society for German education and school history").

Principal works 
 G.R. Weckherlin's Oden und Gesänge; ein Beitrag zur Geschichte der deutschen Dichtung, 1865 – Georg Rudolf Weckherlin's odes and hymns.
 Reformbestrebungen auf dem Gebiete der deutschen Dichtung des XVI. und XVII. Jahrhunderts, 1866 – Reform efforts in the field of German literature of the 16th and 17th century.

References 

1836 births
1915 deaths
University of Halle alumni
University of Bonn alumni
German academic administrators
German philologists
People from Rawicz